Hoseynabad-e Khan (also Romanized as Ḩoseynābād-e Khān and Ḩoseynābād Khān; also known as Hosein Abad Zangi Abad, Ḩoseynābād, Ḩoseynābād-e Bīglar Bīgī, Ḩoseynābād-e Zangīābād, and Husainābād) is a village in Sar Asiab-e Farsangi Rural District, in the Central District of Kerman County, Kerman Province, Iran. At the 2006 census, its population was 546, in 125 families.

References 

Populated places in Kerman County